The Johan Bruyneel Cycling Academy Team, is an Amateur Development road bicycle racing team and named after Johan Bruyneel. JBCA attained UCI status in its inaugural year, 2007 when it changed its name from the Cycling Center. The team is managed by Bernard Moerman.

2008 

The link between the JBCA and  Director Johan Bruyneel strengthened the relationship of the Academy and Fuji Bicycle Corporation to supply the team with bicycles. Moerman also affirmed a sponsorship with SRAM.

Major achievements

Team roster

References

External links 

 Johan Bruyneel Cycling Academy on FujiBikes.com

Cycling teams based in the United States